Richard Vásquez Jiménez is the most senior officer in the Dominican Air Force. On 8 January 2020, he was appointed Chief of the Dominican Joint Chiefs of Staff.

References

Year of birth missing (living people)
Living people
Dominican Republic military personnel